Sarcina is a genus of Gram-positive cocci bacteria in the family Clostridiaceae. A synthesizer of microbial cellulose, various members of the genus are human flora and may be found in the skin  and large intestine. The genus takes its name from the Latin word "sarcina," meaning pack or bundle, after the cuboidal (2x2x2) cellular associations they form during division along three planes.

The genus's type species is Sarcina ventriculi, a variety found on the surface of cereal seeds, in soil, mud, and in the stomachs of humans, rabbits, and guinea pigs.

Species 
 Sarcina aurantiaca
 Sarcina maxima has been reclassified to Clostridium maximum
 Sarcina ventriculi, also known as Clostridium ventriculi
 Sarcina lutea has been reclassified to Micrococcus luteus
 Sarcina troglodytae is a chimpanzee pathogen

References 

Gram-positive bacteria
Clostridiaceae
Bacteria genera